Stefan Bötticher (born 1 February 1992) is a German track cyclist who competes in the sprint events. At the 2013 UCI Track Cycling World Championships he won gold medals in the individual sprint race and the team sprint.

References

External links

German male cyclists
Living people
1992 births
UCI Track Cycling World Champions (men)
People from Leinefelde-Worbis
Cyclists from Thuringia
German track cyclists
Cyclists at the 2020 Summer Olympics
Olympic cyclists of Germany
21st-century German people